Aileen Armitage (pen names Ruth Fabian, Erica Lindley, Aileen Quigley) is a British writer and author of more than thirty-five historical novels. She is partially-sighted and legally blind.

Early life and education
Armitage was born in Luton, Bedfordshire in 1930. She grew up in Huddersfield, West Yorkshire, where her father's family have lived for about 400 years. The family house was in Lindley Moor near Huddersfield. Her grandfather owned a mill in this area. Armitage studied Modern Languages at Hull University and became a teacher, but due to failing eyesight she had to give up teaching. In 1967, she took a creative writing class through night school, and began writing at night with a felt tip pen and had many magazine articles and short stories published before she turned to longer fiction.

Later life and career
Armitage's first novel was accepted by a publisher, who asked her to write more. She has since been widely published in the UK and in the US. She has written under the names Ruth Fabian, Erica Lindley, Aileen Quigley and Aileen Armitage. In the UK, Armitage is a high Public Lending Right earner.

Awards 
In 1988, Armitage received the Frink Woman of the Year Award. In November 2002 Armitage and her husband were awarded honorary Doctor of Literature degree by University of Huddersfield.
International Emmy 1999,
Nominated for a BAFTA,
Winner of the Peabody Prize and Le Priz Crystale all for Lost For Words film, co-written with Deric Longden.

Personal life 
In 1954 Armitage married Peter Quigley, with whom she had four children. The marriage later ended in divorce. In the mid-1980s she met writer Deric Longden, who at that time was married to his first wife Diana, who was experiencing chronic fatigue syndrome or myalgic encephalomyelitis. She died in 1985. Armitage married Longden in 1990 and they moved to Huddersfield. This part of Armitage's life was included in Longden's 1989 novel Diana's Story, later made into a TV film Wide-Eyed and Legless (1993). Armitage was played by Welsh actress Sian Thomas whilst Longden was played by Jim Broadbent. Longden's book Lost For Words (1991), which continued the story of his life with Aileen and his eccentric mother, was also made into a TV film, Lost for Words (1999), in which Penny Downie played Armitage and Pete Postlethwaite played Longden. Thora Hird played Longden's mother Annie in both films. Longden died of cancer of the oesophagus on 23 June 2013.

Works
 Child of Fire, 1971
 King's Pawn, 1971
 Shadow of Dungeon Wood, 1972
 Bloodstone, 1972
 A Theft of Honour, 1972
 Rose Brocade, 1972
 A Scent of Violets, 1973
 A Devil in Holy Orders, 1973
 King Bastard. The Story of William the Conqueror, 1973
 Court Cadenza, 1974
 Empress to the Eagle, 1975
 The Radley Curse, 1975
 The Brackenroyd Inheritance, 1976
 The Devil in Crystal, 1979
 Harvest of Destiny, 1979
 Jacob's Well, 1981
 Hawksmoor, 1981 (Hawksmoor series)
 Pipistrelle, 1982
 A Dark Moon Raging, 1982 (Hawksmoor series)
 Hunter's Moon, 1984 (Hawksmoor series)
 Touchstone, 1987 (Hawksmoor series)
 Chapter of Innocence, 1988
 Hawkrise, 1988 (Hawksmoor series)
 Chapter of Echoes, 1989
 Chapter of Shadows, 1990
 A Midnight Smile, 1993
 The Jericho Years, 1994
 Cedar Street, 1995 (Hawksmoor series)
 Cambermere, 1995
 Annabella, 1996
 The Dark Arches, 1996 (Hawksmoor series)
 Jason's Dominion, 1997
 Mallory Keep, 1998
 The Seamstress, 1999
 A Winter Serpent, 1999
 A Passionate Cause, 2000
 A Double Sacrifice, 2001
 To Catch and Conquer, 2001
 Willerby Manor, 2002
 Flames of Fortune, 2002
 Conflict of Interest, 2005
 The Tudor Sisters, 2005

References

External links
Archive of Deric Longden's official website

 

People from Huddersfield
English blind people
Blind writers
Alumni of the University of Hull
Schoolteachers from Yorkshire
Living people
1930 births